Spirit Warriors is a 2000 Filipino fantasy horror film written and directed by Filipino film director Chito S. Roño. A sequel, Spirit Warriors: The Shortcut, was released in 2002.

Premise
A group of amateur ghost hunters meet their biggest challenge yet, the Ulanaya, a malevolent elemental.

Cast

Main roles
Vhong Navarro as Thor
Jhong Hilario as Buboy
Spencer Reyes as Jigger
Joel Torre as Roman
Danilo Barrios as Red
Chris Cruz as Ponce
Meynard Marcellano as Dos
Sherwin Roux as Nato
Nikko Manalo as Levi
Michael Foz-Sesmundo as Douglas
Denise Joaquin as Gretch

Supporting roles
Pamela delos Santos as Fanny
Fritz Ynfante as Father James
Cris Vertido as Mr. Pio Andres
Dexter Doria as Ms. Arriola
Roy Alvarez as Steve
Raul Dillo as The Ulanaya
Dante Balois as Mang Guding
Nanding Josef as Father Buane
Cezar Xerez-Burgos as Father Virgilio
Christian Alvear as Bong

Production
The film was released by MAQ Productions while the majority of the visual effects were handled by Roadrunner Network, Inc.

Accolades

See also
List of ghost films
Spirit Warriors: The Shortcut
Spirits

References

External links

2000s Tagalog-language films
Philippine horror films
Films directed by Chito S. Roño
Philippine ghost films
2000 films